Niacin, or nicotinic acid, is an organic compound. 

Niacin may also refer to:

 Vitamin B3, colloquially referred to as niacin
 Niacin (band), with Billy Sheehan